Soli Jehangir Sorabjee, AM (9 March 193030 April 2021) was an Indian jurist who served as Attorney-General for India from 1989 to 1990, and again from 1998 to 2004. In 2002, he received the Padma Vibhushan for his defence of the freedom of expression and the protection of human rights.

Early life

Soli Jehangir Sorabjee was born on 9 March 1930 in Bombay to a Bahai family. He studied at Bharda New High School, Mumbai and St. Xavier's College, Mumbai and Government Law College, Mumbai, and was admitted to the bar in 1953. At Government Law College, he was awarded the Kinloch Forbes Gold Medal in Roman Law and Jurisprudence (1952).

Career 
In 1971, Sorabjee was designated a senior advocate of the Bombay High Court. He served as Solicitor-General of India from 1977 to 1980. He was appointed Attorney-General for India on 9 December 1989 up to 2 December 1990, and then again on 7 April 1998, a post he held until 2004.

In March 2002, Soli Sorabjee received the Padma Vibhushan for his defence of the freedom of expression and the protection of human rights. During The Emergency (1975-1977), Sorabjee provided legal services to political prisoners.  He later worked on the Citizen's Justice Committee which represented the 1984 anti-Sikh riots victims pro bono.

In March 2006 he was appointed an honorary member of the Order of Australia (AM), "for service to Australia-India bilateral legal relations".

Sorabjee was involved in several precedent-setting cases concerning the interpretation of the Constitution of India.  Sorabjee and Fali Nariman assisted the petitioner's counsel in Kesavananda Bharati v. State of Kerala, which restricted Parliament from altering the "basic structure" of the Constitution.  As Solicitor-General, he was a member of the government's legal delegation in Maneka Gandhi v Union of India, which held that Article 21 of the Constitution promulgated the right of personal liberty.  He was also involved in S. R. Bommai v. Union of India, which imposed restrictions on President's rule, and I.R. Coelho v. State of Tamil Nadu, which held that laws passed under the Ninth Schedule of the Constitution are not exempt from judicial review. He appeared in the case of B.P. Singhal v. Union of India, in which the Supreme Court held that state governors could not be dismissed without due cause.  He aided the petitioner in Shreya Singhal v. Union of India, which targeted restrictions on online speech in the Information Technology Act, 2000.

Offices
He was the chairman of Transparency International and Convenor of the Minority Rights Group. He served as Special Rapporteur to Nigeria for the United Nations Human Rights Commission in 1997, and as a member of the United Nations Subcommission on Prevention of Discrimination and Protection of Minorities from 1998 onwards. Sorabjee served as member of the Permanent Court of Arbitration at The Hague from 2000 to 2006.

Soli J. Sorabjee was vice-president of the Commonwealth Lawyers Association and a member of the Committee on Arms Control and Disarmament Law of the International Law Association.

Personal life
Sorabjee was a close friend and colleague of Nanabhoy Palkhivala. Sorabjee's daughter, Zia Mody, is also a lawyer and partner at AZB & Partners. Zia Mody is the author of the book 10 Judgements that Changed India. Sorabjee is also survived by three sons—Jehangir, a doctor, Hormazd Sorabjee, editor of the Autocar India magazine and Jamshed.—and seven grandchildren named Niki, Ardeshir, Raian, Maya, Anjali, Aarti, and Aditi.

Sorabjee was the first president of the Jazz India Association.  He played the clarinet; his favourite artists included Benny Goodman and Dizzy Gillespie.

He died of COVID-19, on 30 April 2021 in a private hospital in Delhi where he was undergoing treatment.

Publications

Books

Essays and monographs

Articles 

 
 
 

He also wrote columns for the Indian Express.

Awards
 Kinloch Forbes Gold Medal in Roman Law and Jurisprudence, 1952
 Padma Vibhushan, March 2002
 Justice K. S. Hegde Foundation Award, April 2006

References

External links
 Articles written by Sorabjee for The Indian Express
 Sorabjee on human Rights
 Sorabjee on racism
 Sorabjee on independent journalism

1930 births
2021 deaths
Attorneys General of India
Solicitors General of India
Recipients of the Padma Vibhushan in public affairs
Deaths from the COVID-19 pandemic in India
Honorary Members of the Order of Australia
Indian judges of international courts and tribunals
Indian officials of the United Nations
Members of the Permanent Court of Arbitration
Members of the Sub-Commission on the Promotion and Protection of Human Rights
Parsi people from Mumbai
Scholars from Mumbai
Senior Advocates in India
St. Xavier's College, Mumbai alumni
20th-century Indian lawyers